Ficus broadwayi is a species of plant in the family Moraceae. It is found in Brazil, Colombia, Suriname, and Venezuela.

References

broadwayi
Least concern plants
Taxonomy articles created by Polbot